Doby is a surname. Notable people with the surname include:

Kathryn Doby, Hungarian actress, dancer and choreographer
Larry Doby (1923–2003), American baseball player
Mathieu Doby (born 1982), Belgian slalom canoeist
Winston C. Doby (1940–2011), American university administrator

See also
Dobie (name)